A Minor Leap Down (Persian: پریدن از ارتفاع کم, romanized: Paridan Az Ertefa-e Kam) is a 2015 Iranian drama film directed and written by Hamed Rajabi. It had its world premiere at the 65th Berlin International Film Festival on February 2015.

The film was released on March 18, 2015, in Iran theatrically.

Premise 
Nahal (Negar Javaherian), who is four months pregnant, suddenly realizes that the fetus has died in her belly. she keeps silent and decides not to tell anyone about this incident.

Cast 

 Negar Javaherian as Nahal
 Rambod Javan as Babak
 Mehri Al Agha as Nahal's mother
 Mahmoud Behrouzian as Nahal's father
 Sadaf Ahmadi as Negar
 Shafagh Shokri as Nahal's sister

Reception

Accolades

References

External links 
 

2015 directorial debut films
Persian-language films
Iranian drama films